Curb is defined in older literature as enlargement secondary to inflammation and thickening of the long plantar ligament in horses.  However, with the widespread use of diagnostic ultrasonography in equine medicine, curb has been redefined as a collection of soft tissue injuries of the distal plantar hock region.  Curb is a useful descriptive term when describing swelling in this area.

Structures affected
Besides swelling in the long plantar ligament, injury to the deep digital flexor tendon, superficial digital flexor tendon, tarsocrural lateral collateral ligament or peritendonous/periligamentous tissues in this region can contribute to the appearance of curb. Sickle-hocked conformation is a predisposing risk factor for the development of curb. (See hind leg conformation)

Fluid accumulation and/or swelling are almost always found in the peritendonous/periligamentous tissues in curb, often with no additional underlying injuries.  
Injury to the superficial digital flexor tendon as a cause of curb is as common as injury to the long plantar ligament.  Injury to the deep digital flexor tendon as a cause of curb is less common, and collateral ligament desmitis in the tarsocrural joint is uncommon.  Combination of injury to the long plantar ligament and tendon of the gastrocnemius is also seen.

Diagnosis 
Curb as a visible blemish is an easy diagnosis, as swelling in the distal lateral hock region is, by definition, curb.  However, ultrasound is an essential tool in the diagnosis and in establishing a treatment plan.  Diagnostic anesthesia (local or nerve blocks) can be helpful, but is not perfectly specific in this area.

Treatment 
Treatment generally consists of rest, followed by a controlled exercise program, based on clinical and ultrasound findings.  Many other treatments related to tendon and ligament injuries have been tried.  (See tendinitis)

References

Sources 
 Ross et al. (2002), Curb: A Collection of Plantar Tarsal Soft Tissue Injuries, in Proceedings of the American Association of Equine Practitioners, 48(337-342)

Equine injury and lameness